For information on all Lamar University sports, see Lamar Cardinals and Lady Cardinals

The 2017–18 Lamar Lady Cardinals basketball team represented Lamar University during the 2017–18 NCAA Division I women's basketball season. The Lady Cardinals, led by fifth year head coach Robin Harmony, played their home games at the Montagne Center and are members of the Southland Conference.  The Lady Cardinals finished the season with an overall record of 22-8. They won the Southland Conference regular season championship were 17-1 in Southland play.  After losing to Nicholls in a Southland Conference tournament semi-final game 68-74, the Lady Cardinals were an automatic qualifier to the WNIT.  Their season ended with a first round 68-80 loss to the TCU Horned Frogs in the first round.

Previous season
The Lady Cardinals finished the 2016–17 season with a 21–6, 15–3 Southland play. They lost in the semifinals of the Southland women's tournament to Stephen F. Austin. The Lady Cardinals were invited to the WBI where they lost to Rice, the WBI champion, in the first round.

Roster

Schedule 

|-
!colspan=12 style=""| Non-Conference schedule

|-
!colspan=12 style="" | Conference schedule

|-
!colspan=12 style=""| 

|-
!colspan=12 style=""|

See also 
2017–18 Lamar Cardinals basketball team

References 

Lamar Lady Cardinals basketball seasons
Lamar
Lamar Lady Cardinals basketball
Lamar Lady Cardinals basketball
Lamar